(Station code: MKS) City's railway station is located on Bura Gujjar road, Sri Muktsar Sahib in the Indian state of Punjab and serves Sri Muktsar Sahib city which is the administrative headquarter of the district. Sri Muktsar Sahib railway station falls under Firozpur railway division of Northern Railway zone of Indian Railways.

Overview 
This station is located on the single track,  broad gauge, Kotkapura–Fazilka line.

Electrification 
Sri Muktsar Sahib railway station is situated on single track DMU line. The electrification of the single track BG Kotkapura-Fazilka line is in the pipeline.

Amenities 
Sri Muktsar Sahib railway station has 4 booking windows and all basic amenities like drinking water, public toilets, sheltered area with adequate seating. There is one platforms at the station and one foot overbridge (FOB).

References

External links 

 Pictures of Muktsar railway station

Railway stations in Sri Muktsar Sahib district
Firozpur railway division
Sri Muktsar Sahib district